Okenia harastii is a species of sea slug, specifically a dorid nudibranch, a marine gastropod mollusc in the family Goniodorididae.

Distribution
This species was described from New South Wales, Australia.

Description
This Okenia has six pairs of lateral papillae and two to four papillae on the back, in front of the gills. The back is translucent brown in colour, with scattered dark brown spots. It is similar in shape and arrangement of the papillae to Okenia angelensis, Okenia distincta, Okenia zoobotryon and Okenia mija.

Ecology
The diet of this species is a bryozoan.

References

External links

Harasti, D., 2015. Okenia harastii Pola, Roldán & Padilla, 2014. Photograph 1 of living animal at Nudibranchs of Nelson Bay. 
Harasti, D., 2015. Okenia harastii Pola, Roldán & Padilla, 2014. Photograph 2 of living animal at Nudibranchs of Nelson Bay.

Goniodorididae
Gastropods described in 2014